Localgiving is a membership network and online fundraising platform dedicated to supporting local charities and community groups in the UK.

Localgiving supports local charitable organisations to diversify their income through online fundraising. It provides tools, training and advice to help local groups connect with supporters online, improve their digital skills and develop practical fundraising experience. It is also an advocate for the local voluntary sector and works to raise awareness and support for local groups from the public, government and businesses. Its online fundraising platform enables supporters to make one-time and regular monthly donations, claim Gift Aid, sponsor fundraisers and stay in touch with their chosen local causes. Localgiving also helps local groups to access new sources of funding by taking part in incentivised giving initiatives such as match fund campaigns and competitions.

Localgiving enables charities and community organisations too small to register with the Charity Commission or, in Scotland, the OSCR to benefit from an infrastructure that simplifies the giving process. It also enables them to benefit from Gift Aid on eligible donations through a unique donation journey. Localgiving provides support to small, grassroots aid organisations across the UK.

Legal structure
Localgiving is a charity, registered with the Charity Commission as the Localgiving Foundation (formerly Ardbrack Foundation). Localgiving Ltd is a subsidiary company, wholly owned by the Localgiving Foundation, and employs staff to deliver Localgiving's core programmes and work towards its charitable objectives. It is a not-for-profit social enterprise registered with Companies House in the UK (company registration number 07111208).

Localgiving was founded by Marcelle Speller in partnership with UKCF (UK Community Foundations), which was previously known as Community Foundation Network (CFN) and launched in 2009.

History

Localgiving founder Marcelle Speller OBE and Matthew Bowcock, Chair of CFN, identified the need for Localgiving while at an Institute of Philanthropy course in 2007. Speller established Localgiving in 2008, and in April 2010 she transferred all her shares to UKCF (formerly CFN) and the Localgiving Foundation (formerly the Ardbrack Foundation).

The pilot phase of Localgiving began in autumn 2009 with a user group of eight Community Foundations supporting communities in Berkshire, London, Calderdale, Essex, Hampshire and the Isle of Wight, Hertfordshire, Kent, and Scotland. By the end of the pilot phase in September 2010, 161 local charities and community organisations had signed up.  And by the end of 2012, the number of charities registered on the site had grown to over 3,000 and Localgiving was working with 40+ Community Foundations across the country.

Localgiving has helped local charities and community groups to raise over £13 million since its launch, including a series of "match funding" campaigns with grants provided by the Office for Civil Society and individual philanthropists. Its 2013 Grow Your Tenner campaign turned £500,000 of Cabinet Office funding into over £1.5 million in donations to local charities across England.

Grow Your Tenner
Grow Your Tenner is Localgiving's flagship annual national match fund campaign, leveraging match funding to double online donations by up to £10. 
In 2013 the campaign turned a match fund pot of £500,000, provided by the Cabinet Office, into over £1.5 million worth of donations to over 1,300 local charities in England. 
The campaign typically launches in October each year.

Marcelle Speller 
Marcelle Speller BSc, MBA, OBE, PhD (Hon), is the founder, chairman and primary funder of Localgiving. She is also founder of the Localgiving Foundation, a personal foundation with a mission to enable philanthropic giving to local charities and community groups. In addition, she is a trustee of New Philanthropy Capital 
 
Speller graduated with a BSc in Environmental Sciences from the University of East Anglia and has an MBA from INSEAD. She spent more than 10 years in leading advertising agencies in London and Amsterdam, and held various Director and Board-level marketing positions with multinational companies including American Express, Avis and Inter-Continental Hotels.

In 1996, Speller co-founded Holiday-Rentals.com, which became Europe’s leading website for advertising private holiday homes.  The company was sold to HomeAway Inc in 2005.

Marcelle Speller appeared on Channel 4 Television's The Secret Millionaire in October 2010, when she went undercover in Plymouth, Devon.  In the course of the programme, she gave away almost £100,000 to five local groups: Diggin’ It, Friends and Families of Special Children, Jeremiah’s Journey, Welcome Hall, and Horizons.

In December 2010 Speller contributed to the Cabinet Office's Giving Green Paper with the essay "Giving in Local Communities" and to the Thunderer column in The Times.

In the Queen's 2011 Birthday Honours Marcelle Speller was awarded an OBE for her service to the voluntary sector.

Speller has become a spokesperson for TV, radio and print media for comment on philanthropy issues as they affect small, local charities and community groups. In April 2012, she was widely quoted across all media when the government suggested a cap on tax relief for major donors.

Gift Aid

Gift Aid increases the value of donations by allowing charities and Community Amateur Sports Clubs (CASCs) to reclaim basic rate tax on gifts. When donors make gifts from income on which they have already paid tax, charities or CASCs can reclaim the basic rate tax from HMRC.

Localgiving allows donors to claim Gift Aid when giving to voluntary community groups that are not registered by the Charity Commission by having the community foundations, who vet the charitable groups, receive the money for them.

Publicity
Localgiving has featured in national, local and online publications, such as the "Civil Society" 15 March 2012,, "Northampton Chronicle and Echo" 27 April 2012 , "Plymouth Herald" 14 May 2012 , "The Guardian" 24 May 2012  and "Birmingham Mail" 9 October 2012 

Following the screening of The Secret Millionaire and the launch of Localgiving in Devon, the website has featured in numerous local publications including South West Business and the Plymouth Post.

See also

Comparable organisations raising money for charity using technology: 
Justgiving 
Virgin Money Giving 
The Big Give 
Bmycharity
IStreet Giving

References

British fundraising websites
Organisations based in the London Borough of Hackney
UK Community Foundations